Agonum collare is a species of ground beetle in the family Carabidae.

References

Further reading

 

collare
Articles created by Qbugbot
Beetles described in 1830